FC Groningen in European football includes the games which have been played by FC Groningen in European competitions organised by UEFA.

Totals

Top scorers

Competitions by Countries

Most Played Teams

Results

(1981–1990)

1983–84 season

Groningen won 4–2 on aggregate.

Internazionale won 5–3 on aggregate.

1986–87 season

Groningen won 8–2 on aggregate.

1–1 on aggregate; Groningen won on away goals.

Vitória de Guimarães won 3–1 on aggregate.

1988–89 season

2–2 on aggregate. Groningen won on away goals.

Groningen won 3–1 on aggregate.

Stuttgart won 5–1 on aggregate.

1989–90 season

Groningen won 3–1 on aggregate.

Partizan won 6–5 on aggregate.

(1991–2000)

1991–92 season

Rot-Weiß Erfurt won 2–0 on aggregate.

1992–93 season

Vác FC-Samsung won 2–1 on aggregate.

1995–96 season

1996–97 season

1997–98 season

(2001–2010)

2006–07 season

Partizan won 4-3 on aggregate.

2007–08 season

Fiorentina 2–2 Groningen on aggregate. Fiorentina won 4–3 on penalties.

(2011–2020)

2014–15 season

Aberdeen won 2–1 on aggregate.

2015–16 season

Notes

References

External links
 FC Groningen in UEFA
 Official web site of FC Groningen

FC Groningen
Dutch football clubs in international competitions